Temnora uluguru is a moth of the  family Sphingidae. It is known from Tanzania.

References

Temnora
Moths described in 2004